Poezii (Romanian for "Poems") is an 1882 collection of poetry by the Romanian poet Alexandru Macedonski. It contains the following poems:
Ocnele, "The Salt Mines"
Formele (Satiră), "The Forms (Satire)" 
Noaptea de aprilie, "April Night" 
Accente intime, "Intimate Tones" 
Poeţii, "The Poets"
Noaptea de septembrie (La muză), "September Nights (To the Muse)"
Noaptea de iunie, "June Night" 
Vioristul, "The Violinist" 
Hinov 
Calul arabului, "The Arab's Horse" 
Templul bogăţiei, "The Temple of Richness" 
La suflet, "To the Soul"
Lupta şi toate sunetele ei (Armonie imitativă), "Fighting and All Its Sounds (Imitative Harmony)" 
Destinul, "The Destiny" 
La harpă, "To the Harp" 
Focul sacru..., "The Sacred Fire"
Tinereţea, "Youth" 
Odă la condeiul meu, "Ode to My Pen" 
Filozofia morţii (Toast purtat la un banchet), "The Philosophy of Death (Toasted during a Banquet)"
Albaspina, "The Hawthorn" 
Reîntoarcerea "The Return" 
Răspuns la câţiva critici (Fragment), "An Answer to a Few Critics (Fragment)"

Romanian poetry
Alexandru Macedonski
Romanian books
1882 books